DJMax Portable: Hot Tunes (Korean: 디제이맥스 포터블 핫튠즈; Japanese: DJマックス ホットチューンズ) is an action-rhythm video game for the PlayStation Portable published and developed by Pentavision. It is a compilation of the DJMax Portable and DJMax Portable 2 games. The game is intended to be beginner-friendly and Pentavision stated that players who have never played the DJMax series would find it easy to play. It also has been specifically designed for a Japanese audience and precautions have been taken in avoiding translation errors. It is the second DJMax game to be formally released in Japan. Hot Tunes is the sixth installment of the DJMax series for the PlayStation Portable platform. Currently only a UMD distribution for the game is available. A total of 2000 limited edition sets was made available. Each package included a wooden case, calendar, original soundtrack and piano collection, and eight mini-posters.

Features
The main menu UI was based on DJMax Portable and other features were derived from Portable 2. The game uses the opening from DJMax Portable, Ask to Wind Live Mix. The game introduced '4B Lite', an easier 4B (4-button) mode for beginners which can be compared to 2B (2-button) mode in DJMax Portable Clazziquai Edition. Alongside 4B Lite, the game includes traditional 4B, 6B, and 8B modes. The Link Disc and Album sections are both absent. The Auto-Correction feature (in which any button can be used to hit a note), introduced in Black Square and used in Fever and Trilogy, has been removed. The green 'Specialized Note' introduced in DJMax Portable Black Square and DJ Max Fever, giving bonus points when hit and stops the background music when missed, has been removed as well.

Music
Hot Tunes includes songs from DJMax Portable and DJMax Portable 2.

Ask to Wind (Japanese Version)
Chrono Breakers
End of the Moonlight
Heart Beat
Let's Go Baby
Fallen Angel
Brandnew Days
Ray Of Illuminati
Jupiter driving
Chain of Gravity
higher
Never Say
MASAI
NB Ranger
NANO RISK
Rolling On the Duck
Mess it up
Can We Talk
Miles
Futurism
Eternal Memory
Hello Pinky
Save My Dream
Sunny Side
For Seasons
OBLIVION
A.I
Seeker
whiteblue
Minimal Life
Hamsin
BLYTHE

Luv Flow
Memory of Beach
Every Morning
sO mUCH iN LUV
Ladymade Star
Stay with me
Good Bye
DIVINE SERVICE
Out Law
Syriana
Enemy Storm
Rock Or Die
GET OUT
Starfish
Get On Top
NB RANGERS : Returns
Fentanest
Another DAY
Phantom Of Sky
MidNight Blood
SIN
Nightmare
IKARUS
FTR
SQUEEZE
BRAIN STORM
Cherokee
Light House
TaeKwonBuri
Astro Fight
Sunset Rider
OBLIVION (Rockin` Night Style)

Glitches
Inside MV Edition mode, there are two music videos labeled "Sunset Rider". One of them is actually the music video for "Sunny Side".

See also 
DJMax - DJMax series.
DJ Max Fever - A similar compilation version marketed towards North America.

External links 
Official Pentavision website

References 

2010 video games
DJMax games
Video games developed in South Korea
PlayStation Portable games
PlayStation Portable-only games
South Korea-exclusive video games
Music video games
Turntable video games